Great Britain is scheduled to compete at the 2017 World Aquatics Championships in Budapest, 
Hungary from 14 July to 30 July.

Medalists

Diving

Great Britain has entered 12 divers (seven male and five female).

Men

Women

Mixed

High diving

Great Britain qualified three male high divers.

Open water swimming

Great Britain has entered six open water swimmers

Swimming

British swimmers have achieved qualifying standards in the following events (up to a maximum of 2 swimmers in each event at the A-standard entry time, and 1 at the B-standard):

Men

Women

Mixed

Synchronized swimming

Great Britain's synchronized swimming team consisted of 2 athletes (2 female).

Women

References

Nations at the 2017 World Aquatics Championships
Great Britain at the World Aquatics Championships
2017 in British sport